John Gorham Maitland (1818–1863) was an English academic and civil servant; he was a Cambridge Apostle.

Life
He was the son of Samuel Roffey Maitland. He was born at Taunton, and had a private education.

Maitland was admitted to Trinity College, Cambridge in 1835. There he became one of the Cambridge Apostles. He also became a Fellow of the college, after having obtained high places in the Tripos, both classical and mathematical, in 1839.

Maitland was called to the bar at Lincoln's Inn, but found little practice. He was elected a Fellow of the Royal Society in 1847. He was secretary to the Civil Service Commission in succession to his Cambridge friend James Spedding from 1855 until his death in 1863.

Works
Maitland wrote for a period in the Morning Chronicle. He was the author of two pamphlets, Church Leases, 1849, and Property and Income Tax, 1853.

Family
Maitland's wife Emma, second daughter of John Frederic Daniell, died in 1851. He was survived by a son, Frederic William Maitland, and two daughters.

Notes

Attribution

1818 births
1863 deaths
Fellows of Trinity College, Cambridge
English barristers
Fellows of the Royal Society
English male journalists
People from Taunton
19th-century British journalists
English male non-fiction writers
19th-century English male writers
19th-century English lawyers